Erkan is a common Turkish given name. It is composed of "Er" and "Kan". In Turkish "Er" means "Male", "Brave", "Valiant"  and "Kan" means "Blood", "Lineage". Thus, "Erkan" means "a brave male with valiant lineage".

 Erkan Meri¢ (born 1986),Turkish actor
Erkan Can (born 1958), Turkish actor
Erkan Mumcu (born 1963), Turkish politician
Erkan Zengin (born 1985), Turkish-Swedish footballer
 (born 1935), Turkish TV host and presenter
Erkan Petekkaya (born 1970), Turkish actor
Erkan Kolçak Köstendil (born 1983), Turkish actor
Erkan Oğur (born 1954), Turkish musician
Erkan Mutlu (born 1962), Turkish musician
Erkan Yücel (born 1944), Turkish actor
Erkan Sever (born 1974), Turkish actor
Erkan Mustafa (born 1970), British-Turkish actor
Erkan Özbey (born 1978), Turkish footballer
Erkan Öztürk (born 1983), German-Turkish footballer
Erkan Sağlık (born 1985), Turkish footballer
Erkan Taşkıran (born 1985), Turkish footballer
Erkan Veyseloğlu (born 1983), Turkish basketball player
Erkan Kaş (born 1991), Turkish footballer

Surname
Enes Erkan (born 1987), Turkish karateka
Hüseyin Erkan (born 1958), Turkish civil servant
Medine Erkan (born 1995), Turkish women's footballer

See also
Ercan (disambiguation)

Surnames
Turkish-language surnames
Turkish masculine given names